The Martello Gallery-Key West Art and Historical Museum (also known as the East Martello Tower), is a historic site located at 3501 South Roosevelt Boulevard, Key West, Florida, United States.  On June 19, 1972, it was added to the U.S. National Register of Historic Places.  It is the best-preserved example of the Martello style of military architecture in the country.

Fort East Martello Museum & Gardens
The site is now known as the Fort East Martello Museum & Gardens, and features exhibits of local history and art.  Displays include early settlement, sponging and fishing, Cuban influence, military involvement, writers and other characters.  The museum notably houses Robert the Doll, a supposedly haunted doll belonging to the late artist Robert Eugene Otto.  The museum also features works by folk artist Mario Sanchez, and art created from junk by Stanley Papio.

The Key West Art & Historical Society operates the museum.

References

 Monroe County listings at National Register of Historic Places
 Florida's Office of Cultural and Historical Programs
 Monroe County listings
 East Martello Gallery and Museum

External links

Fort East Martello Museum & Gardens - official site

Towers completed in 1862
Buildings and structures in Key West, Florida
Forts in Key West, Florida
History of Key West, Florida
Museums in Key West, Florida
National Register of Historic Places in Key West, Florida
History museums in Florida
Art museums and galleries in Florida
Military and war museums in Florida
Landmarks in Key West, Florida
Martello towers
Martello, East
1862 establishments in Florida